There are over 20,000 Grade II* listed buildings in England. This page is a list of these buildings in the district of South Holland in Lincolnshire.

South Holland

|}

Notes

External links

Lists of Grade II* listed buildings in Lincolnshire
 
Grade